The 1956 Milan–San Remo was the 47th edition of the Milan–San Remo cycle race and was held on 19 March 1956. The race started in Milan and finished in San Remo. The race was won by Fred De Bruyne.

General classification

References

1956
1956 in road cycling
1956 in Italian sport
1956 Challenge Desgrange-Colombo
March 1956 sports events in Europe